Una Ka BAI!: Una sa Balita, also known as Una Ka BAI!: Balita At Iba Pa is a Philippine television news broadcasting program broadcast by GMA Davao. Originally hosted by Derf Maiz,  Sarah Hilomen-Velasco and MK Sobrecarey, it premiered on October 8, 2007. The newscast concluded on April 24, 2015.  Marlon Palma Gil,  Shielah Vergara-Rubio,  Dotty Ibanez and Sara Duterte served as the final hosts.

Overview
The program registered an increase of 2.1 percent from 6.6 percent in October to 8.7 in partial November 2013 based on monthly data from ratings service ABS-CBN only received 5.8%. provider Nielsen TV Audience Measurement.

Without saying goodbyes after 7 years, it had their final broadcast last April 24, 2015, as part of the streamlining of regional operations of GMA, after the broadcast, the on-air staff of the program were retrenched by the network's management.

GMA Davao would not have a morning news program  regional morning newscast until 5 years later, with the launch of At Home with GMA Regional TV.

Final hosts
Marlon Palma Gil
Sheillah Vergara-Rubio
Dotty Ibanez
Sara Duterte

Former hosts
Cherry Maning
Lanley Guillermo
Sarah Jane Hilomen-Velasco
Derf Hanzel Maiz
MK Sobrecarey
Paulo Molina
Nichole Vanessa Layno
Anna Angelica Sotto
Darrell "Uncle D" Blatchley

References 

2007 Philippine television series debuts
2015 Philippine television series endings
GMA Network news shows
GMA Integrated News and Public Affairs shows
Philippine television news shows
Television in Davao City